BAL – Bashkirian Airlines was an airline with its head office on the property of Ufa International Airport in Ufa, Russia. It operated regional and trunk routes from Ufa and charter services to Europe, Asia and North Africa. The company was founded in 1991 and liquidated in 2007.

History
The airline was founded in 1991, originally set up as an Aeroflot division and was formerly part of the Samara-based Aerovolga. It began to make permanent domestic, foreign connections and charter flights to Cairo, Tunis and Barcelona.

In October 2006, the airline lost its air operator's certificate after intense security renovations with the Ministry of Transport. In April 2007, Bashkirian Airlines filed for backruptcy and ceased operations. It had 1,513 employees at the time of its dissolution.

Destinations

As of January 2005, Bashkirian Airlines operated the following services:

Fleet

The Bashkirian Airlines fleet consisted of the following aircraft:

Accidents and incidents
2002 Überlingen mid-air collision: On July 1, 2002, Bashkirian Airlines Flight 2937, a Tupolev Tu-154M (registered as RA-85816) was on a charter flight from Moscow, Russia to Barcelona, Spain. The plane was flying over southern Germany when it collided with a DHL International Boeing 757-200PF, flying from Bergamo, Italy, to Brussels, Belgium, over the city of Überlingen near the German-Swiss border. The DHL plane’s tail slammed into the fuselage of the Tupolev Tu-154. The collision killed the 2 crew members on board the Boeing 757, and all 69 passengers and crew on the Tupolev, mostly Russian schoolchildren from Bashkortostan on a vacation, organized by the local UNESCO committee, to the Costa Dorada region of Spain.

See also
List of defunct airlines of Russia

References

External links

bal.ufanet.ru (Archive, 1999–2001)
aircompanybal.ru (Archive) 
bal.ufanet.ru (Archive) 
"Russian airline's 'good safety record'," BBC

Defunct airlines of Russia
Airlines established in 1991
Airlines disestablished in 2007
Companies based in Ufa
Former Aeroflot divisions
2007 disestablishments in Russia
Russian companies established in 1991